Marie Parmentier, married name Marie Hackin, (1905-1941) was an archaeologist and Resistance member who worked with her husband Joseph Hackin, who also was an archaeologist, philologist, and Resistance member. Marie Hackin's father was from Luxembourg. She died in 1941 when she was in a sea convoy trying to go from Liverpool into the Atlantic ocean en route to Africa, when the ship was sunk by a German submarine.

Selected works 
 with Joseph Hackin: Le site archéologiques de Bamyan. Guide du visiteur. Les édition d'art et d'histoire, Paris 1934.
 German: Bamian. Führer zu den buddhistischen Höhlenklöstern und Kolossalstatuen. Les édition d'art et d'histoire, Paris 1939.
 with Joseph Hackin: Recherches archéologiques à Begram: chantier no. 2 (1937), Mémoires de la délégation archéologique française en Afghanistan Vol. 9. Les Éditions d'art et d'histoire, Paris 1939.
 with Ahmad Ali Kohzad: Légendes et coutumes afghanes,  Publications du Musée Guimet. Bibliothèque de diffusion Vol. 60. Presses Universitaires de France, Paris 1953.
 with Joseph Hackin: Nouvelles recherches archéologiques à Begram, ancienne Kâpici, 1939–1940, Mémoires de la Délégation archéologique française en Afghanistan Vol. 11. Presses Universitaires de France, Paris 1954.

Sources 
 Joseph et Ria Hackin. Couple d'origine luxembourgeoise au service des arts asiatiques et de la France. Exposition organisée dans le cadre de l'Accord culturel franco-luxembourgeois est réalisée avec le concours du Musée Guimet, Paris. Musée d'Histoire et d'Art Musées d'État – Luxembourg. Exposition du 11 novembre 1987 au 3 janvier 1988, Luxembourg. Musée d'Histoire et d'Art, Luxemburg 1987.
 Marie Hackin. In: Vladimir Trouplin: Dictionnaire des Compagnons de la Libération. Bordeaux, Elytis 2010,  (Digital).

Notes 

1905 births
1941 deaths
French archaeologists
Archaeologists of the Near East
French women archaeologists
French Resistance members
Female resistance members of World War II
Companions of the Liberation
Recipients of the Croix de Guerre 1939–1945 (France)
French civilians killed in World War II
French women in World War II
20th-century archaeologists
20th-century French women
French people of Luxembourgian descent